AVK may refer to:
 Astronomische Vereinigung Kärntens
 Antivitamin K drugs or vitamin K antagonists
AVK Group, manufacture of sanitary fittings
Kotava language, ISO code "avk"